The Nihon Ki-in Hall of Fame was created in 2004 as part of the Nihon Ki-in's 80th anniversary celebrations, and housed in the basement of its headquarters in Ichigaya.

Inductees are selected by the eight-member Go Hall of Fame Awards Committee, of which Otake Hideo, the Nihon Ki-in chairman, and Rin Kaiho, the Professional Go Players Association chairman, are both members. According to the Nihon Ki-in, those inducted need not be the most renowned players, since even "non-professionals who have contributed to the development of Go will also be honoured."

Inductees

Listed in reverse chronological order.

2021
  Takagawa Kaku

2020
Hideyuki Fujisawa

2019
Eio Sakata
Cho Nam-chul

2018
Matsutarō Shōriki

2017
Masaoka Shiki

2016
Kanren
Inoue Gennan Inseki

2015
Go Seigen

2014
Utaro Hashimoto

2013
Kita Fumiko

2012
Yasui Santetsu
Chen Yi

2011
Iwamoto Kaoru

2010
Kitani Minoru

2009
Segoe Kensaku

2008
Honinbo Shuei
Honinbo Shusai

2007
Honinbo Shuho

2006
Honinbo Shuwa
Baron Okura Kishichiro

2005
Honinbo Jowa

2004
Honinbo Sansa
Honinbo Dosaku
Honinbo Shusaku
Tokugawa Ieyasu

References

Go players
History of Go
Halls of fame in Japan